Ampara Urban Council (AUC) is the local authority for the town of Ampara in eastern Sri Lanka. AUC is responsible for providing a variety of local public services including roads, sanitation, drains, housing, libraries, public parks and recreational facilities. It has 9 members elected using the open list proportional representation system.

Election results

1983 local government election
Results of the local government election held on 18 May 1983:

2002 local government election
Results of the local government election held on 25 March 2002:

The following candidates were elected: Amarasena Ilangamge (UNP), 4,868 preference votes (pv); Aththudawa Liyanaarachchige Gamini Nadeelal Gunawardhana (UNP), 3,506 pv; Amarawansha Wadumesthrige (UNP), 1,419 pv; Galmangoda Guruge Bandula Jayantha (UNP), 1,213 pv; Jayaneththi Arachchi Berty (UNP), 1,212 pv; I. D. Chulachandra (PA), 1,063 pv; K. M. Saman Indika Morayas (PA), 917 pv; Ariyapala Rammuthupura (UNP), 879 pv; and Vidanage Piyasena Kumaranayaka (UNP); 660 pv.

Amarasena Ilangamge (UNP) and Aththudawa Liyanaarachchige Gamini Nadeelal Gunawardhana (UNP) were appointed Chairman and Deputy Chairman respectively.

2006 local government election
Results of the local government election held on 30 March 2006:

The following candidates were elected: Ilandarideva Chulachandra (UPFA); Ambalangodage Sarath Deshapriya (UPFA); Galbokka Hewage Sudarman De Silva (UPFA); Abesundara Wickramasooriya Boosabaduge Nishantha Manjula Fernando (UNP); Aththudawa Liyana Arachchige Gamini Nadilal Gunawardana (UNP); Clor Muhandiramge Saman Indika Morayas (UPFA); Galmangoda Guruge Wimalananda Sumanasooriya (UPFA); I. P. Wijaya Weerasooriya (JVP); and Ediriweera Arachchige Shantha Wickramasekara (UNP).

Ambalangodage Sarath Deshapriya (UPFA) and Clor Muhandiramge Saman Indika Morayas (UPFA) were appointed Chairman and Deputy Chairman respectively.

The term of the council was due to expire in 2010 but on 22 December 2009 Minister of Local Government and Provincial Councils Janaka Bandara Tennakoon extended it until 31 March 2011.

2011 local government election
Results of the local government election held on 17 March 2011:

The following candidates were elected: Ambalangodage Sarath Deshappriya (UPFA); Abeysundara Wikramasooriya Boosabaduge Nishantha Manjula Fernando (UNP); Kalthotage Kelum Kumara Fernando (UPFA); Indika Naleen Jayavikrama (UPFA); Dulip Lal Kumanayaka (UPFA); Clormuhandiram Saman Indika Morayas (UPFA); Manjula Sri Ilangamge (UNP); Manodara Aacharige Chaminda Sugath (UPFA); and Ediriwera Arachchige Shantha Wikkramasekara (UNP).

Indika Naleen Jayavikrama (UPFA) and Manodara Aacharige Chaminda Sugath (UPFA) were appointed Chairman and Deputy Chairman respectively.

References

Ampara
Local authorities in Eastern Province, Sri Lanka
Urban councils of Sri Lanka